Brana is a ridge mountain of the Kamnik Alps in northern Slovenia. It is located between the Logar Valley to the north and the Kamnik Bistrica Valley to the south. The mountain is part of the central Kamnik group, a long ridge that includes the highest peaks of the range such as Grintovec, Kočna, and Skuta. Brana is sometimes climbed as part of a long traverse of the entire Kamnik ridge.

Starting points 
 Kamnik, the Kamnik Bistrica Valley
 Solčava, the Logar Valley

Routes 
 2½ hrs from the Frischauf Lodge at Okrešelj at 
 1 hr from the Kamnik Saddle Lodge at

References

External links 
 
 Brana on hribi.net Route Description and Photos (slo)
 Brana na Summitpost

Mountains of the Kamnik–Savinja Alps
Mountains of Upper Carniola
Two-thousanders of Slovenia